Oregon Field Guide is a weekly television program produced by Oregon Public Broadcasting focusing on recreation, the outdoors, and environmental issues in the state of Oregon. The show has become part of the Oregon zeitgeist. Steve Amen is the show's creator and original Executive Producer. Ed Jahn, producer with Oregon Field Guide since 2000, became host and Executive Producer in 2016/2017 upon Steve Amen's retirement. Named for the field guides used to identify plants, animals, and natural phenomenon, the wide-ranging series covers Oregon natural history, outdoor recreation, conservation, agriculture, rural life, and other local subjects. Produced with deep narratives rather than short segments, roughly 13 half-hour episodes and specials are shown per year.

History
Oregon Field Guide started as a partnership between Oregon Public Broadcasting (OPB) and the Oregon Department of Fish and Wildlife. The pilot first aired in 1989. The program became the sole production of OPB with the series premier in 1990, which began with the impact of drift netting for tuna on dolphins. Using the information from this story, Amen also produced an award-winning Frontline episode, titled "To The Last Fish", which aired in 1991. Oregon Field Guide was kept during major state budget cuts in 2003 that affected OPB. In that year, the show budget was $300,000, with the majority of funding coming from the viewers.

Most stories are narrated by the lead producer/reporter, though Executive Producers Ed Jahn and Steve Amen have also narrated reports produced by others. Jim Newman produced over 250 Oregon Field Guide segments, and was brought on when Amen got the greenlight on the series.

From the series premier in 1990, Oregon Field Guide remains one of the highest rated of any locally produced PBS show in the nation, and The Oregonian called it "the crown jewel in OPB's otherwise lackluster record of locally produced programming." In 1998, the show was the most-watched local TV series in the PBS system.

Past producers/reporters include Jim Newman, Steve Lobel, Eric Cain, Jessica Martin, Vince Patton and Jeff Douglas.

Awards

Oregon Field Guide and its crew have won more than 25 regional Emmys in its first 26 seasons. The awards are for everything from best Environmental Program, Topical Documentary, Audio, Informational Special to Community Service. The programs have also won two Edward R. Murrow awards, several Telly awards, numerous awards from the Society of Professional Journalists as well as the very prestigious silver batonAlfred I. duPont-Columbia University Award.

The show's producers Vince Patton and Ed Jahn have received awards from the Society of Environmental Journalists Society of Environmental Journalists for "Outstanding Beat/In-Depth Reporting, Television". Patton received an award for his reporting in the episode "Marmot Dam," and Jahn for his reporting in "Biscuit Fire Recovery" and "The Silent Invasion." When presenting the award for reporting on the Marmot Dam removal, the society recognized Oregon Field Guide, stating:

The show has won eight Regional Emmys. One was in 1995 for the "outstanding informational series/magazine short format division", and another in the "best public affairs special" in 1998 for their one-hour special titled "Willamette Water Quality".

It also received two Golden Eagle awards from the Council on International Nontheatrical Events in 1994: one for an hourlong report on "Cleaning Up Hanford", and the other for "Abuses of the 1872 Mining Law". The latter report also received an honorable mention in the Public Affairs category of the Pacific Mountain Network's "Best of the West" awards in that year.

Notable segments
Oregon Field Guide has filmed while diving in Spirit Lake, titled "Ecological Mysteries of Spirit Lake". It showed the rebirth of the lake after the 1980 eruption of Mount St. Helens.

The unfiltered and pure water of the Bull Run watershed, has been featured in two seasons. It has also covered near-extinct bighorn sheep and mountain unicycling, and how Estacada High School students used Cycle Oregon's visit to raise funds for their school.

The Silent Invasion
The Silent Invasion was an OPB documentary production studying the threats posed by invasive species in the state. It was produced and written by Ed Jahn. The documentary focused on the influence of yellow-star thistle, quagga mussels, spartina and English ivy, among other invasive species.  The production involved a campaign and outreach component that included the Oregon Invasive Species Council (OISC) and SOLV Oregon. The ultimate goal of the special was to serve as a wake-up call about invasive species and to inspire citizens to take action. Species documented included Yellow star thistle, Spartina, and Quagga mussels.

The special won a silver baton level Alfred I. duPont–Columbia University Award in 2009. The award jury was "struck by the boldness and courage of OPB to attack such issues and then to put resources against it." It also received three Regional Emmys.

References

External links 

 “Oregon Field Guide Education Program; Focus on Organisms; Part 1,” 1994-03, The Walter J. Brown Media Archives & Peabody Awards Collection at the University of Georgia, American Archive of Public Broadcasting
 “Oregon Field Guide Education Program; Focus on Organisms; Part 2,” 1994-03, The Walter J. Brown Media Archives & Peabody Awards Collection at the University of Georgia, American Archive of Public Broadcasting

Mass media in Oregon
1990 American television series debuts
2000s American television series
2010s American television series
Geography of Oregon
Oregon culture
1990 establishments in Oregon